Kaju-ye Pain (also Romanized as Kājū-ye Pā’īn, Kāchū-e Pā’īn, and Kāhjū-e Pā’īn) is a village in Jolgeh-e Mazhan Rural District, Jolgeh-e Mazhan District, Khusf County, South Khorasan Province, Iran. At the 2006 census, its population was 36, in 11 families.

References 

Populated places in Khusf County